Sergei Malkhazovich Bagayev (born 6 April 1985) is a former Russian professional football player.

Club career
He played in the Russian Football National League for FC Irtysh Omsk in 2010.

External links
 
 

1985 births
Living people
Russian footballers
Association football defenders
FC Spartak Vladikavkaz players
FC Energiya Volzhsky players
FC Smena Komsomolsk-na-Amure players
FC Irtysh Omsk players